The manga series Case Closed, known as  in Japan, features a large number of recurring fictional characters created by Gosho Aoyama. The series takes place in modern-day Japan and follows an amateur detective Shinichi Kudo (English name: Jimmy Kudo) who solves cases in an episodic fashion while in his childhood body and under the alias Conan Edogawa. He is joined by childhood friend Ran Mori (Rachel Moore) and her father Kogoro Mori (Richard Moore), who runs a detective agency. Throughout the series, Conan interacts and befriends many characters from various groups: the Tokyo Metropolitan Police, the local police in Conan's prefecture; The Junior Detective League, a group of children who solves mysteries for their clients and the FBI. He also befriends a few individuals who know of his true identity: Dr. Agasa, who provides Shinichi with various spy gadgets; Heiji Hattori (Harley Hartwell), a high school detective from Osaka; and Ai Haibara (Anita Hailey), the original developer of the poison who had also transformed into a child.

The manga is licensed by Viz Media while the anime adaptation was first licensed and dubbed by Funimation, then later dubbed the Macias Group and released on Tubi. Funimation and Viz have Americanized many character names, with both companies using different names or spellings for the same characters on several occasions. Other English releases such as the manga published in Singapore by Shogakukan Asia, the anime streaming on Tubi, and the home videos dubbed by Bang Zoom! Entertainment and released through Discotek Media romanize the Japanese names.

The list follows the names as presented by the Shogakukan Asia Manga.

Main characters

Shinichi Kudo

Voiced by (English): Jerry Jewell (Funimation), Griffin Burns (Bang Zoom/Macias Group) (Shinichi); Alison Viktorin (Funimation), Wendee Lee (Bang Zoom/Macias Group) (Conan)
Voiced by (Japanese): Kappei Yamaguchi (Shinichi); Minami Takayama (Conan)
Portrayed by: Shun Oguri, Junpei Mizobata (Shinichi); Nao Fujisaki (Conan) 
, known as Jimmy Kudo in some English adaptations, is the main protagonist of the series, a high school detective who solves difficult cases for the police. During one of his investigations, he is attacked and forced to take an experimental poison by a member of the Black Organization. However, due to a rare side-effect, he shrinks to the form of a young child. In order to keep his true identity a secret, he now goes under the alias  and pretends to be a real child to throw off suspicion while he secretly solves many cases and looks for clues about the organization. He loves his childhood friend Ran Mori, but cannot confess his feelings or reveal his true identity in order to protect her.

Ran Mori

Voiced by (English): Colleen Clinkenbeard (Funimation); Cristina Vee (Bang Zoom/Macias Group)
Voiced by (Japanese): Wakana Yamazaki
Portrayed by: Tomoka Kurokawa; Shiori Kutsuna 
, known as Rachel Moore in English, has been Shinichi Kudo's friend since elementary school. She adores Shinichi but is afraid to admit it, and whenever the subject of their relationship is brought up, she denies it is romantic. Ran frequently worries about his safety and anticipates his return. As captain of the karate team and a regional champion, she is an accomplished fighter but remains fearful of horror films.  Ran's parents are also skilled martial artists. She is very kind and willing to assist anyone in need, even if the individual is a potential criminal. In one instance, her compassion motivates Vermouth to keep Shinichi's identity hidden from the Black Organization. As with Shinichi, she opposes the idea of killing anyone, including criminals, believing that criminals should face trial. She is regarded as a role model by the Junior Detective League, and the children frequently seek her advice. She is adept at household chores such as sewing, knitting, and cooking, and has a knack for chance games, rarely losing in games such as mahjong. She spends the majority of her time at home caring for Conan and her father. Her parents live apart, and she is hoping that they will reconcile. She has suspected Conan Edogawa of being Shinichi throughout the series. Nonetheless, Shinichi dupes her into second-guessing herself. Her name, Ran Mori, originates from Maurice Leblanc (Mo-ri-su Ru-bu-ran), the creator of Arsene Lupin.

Kogoro Mori

Voiced by (English): R. Bruce Elliott (Funimation); Xander Mobus (Bang Zoom/Macias Group)
Voiced by (Japanese): Akira Kamiya (1996–2009); Rikiya Koyama (2009–present)
Portrayed by: Takanori Jinnai
 , known as Richard Moore in English, is Ran's father and a private detective. Kogoro gains fame due to Conan frequently sedating him and impersonating his voice to solve cases. He and Conan share a certain amount of rivalry. At times, Kogoro is egocentric, claiming credit for cracking cases that Conan had already solved during their time together. Before becoming a private detective, he worked as a police officer under Inspector Megure. He is married to Eri Kisaki, a successful lawyer and childhood friend, but they have been separated for over ten years due to their constant arguing. He reveals that on many occasions, he still loves her and has attempted to reconcile their relationship. Despite his irresponsible habits of drinking, gambling, and flirting with young women, he cares deeply for his daughter and at times displays his sense of honor and strict ethics. He is skilled in Judo. His name, Kogoro Mori, originates from Kogoro Akechi, the detective in Edogawa Rampo's stories.

Junior Detective League

Dr. Agasa often chaperones the kids and assists them when a case needs to be solved. As a symbol of the group, each member has a badge used as a walkie-talkie and a tracer.

Ayumi Yoshida 

Voiced by (English): Monica Rial (Funimation); Janice Kawaye (Bang Zoom); Krystal Valdes (Macias Group)
Voiced by (Japanese): Yukiko Iwai
, known as Amy Yoshida in English and dubbed by Funimation as Amy Yeager, is Conan Edogawa's friend and classmate. Ayumi was the sole female member of the Junior Detective League until they got Ai Haibara to join. She has a crush on Conan, which makes him uncomfortable, and was jealous that Ai attracts Conan's attention, and that Conan seems to be attracted to Ran. She is a naive and innocent little girl who shows courage from time to time and acts as the team's cheerful spirit. Ayumi and Ai later become good friends, referring to each other on a first name basis and adding "-chan" in the Japanese version.

Mitsuhiko Tsuburaya

Voiced by (English): Cynthia Cranz (Funimation); Erika Harlacher (Bang Zoom); Ghia Burns (Macias Group)
Voiced by (Japanese): Ikue Ōtani; Ai Orikasa (episodes 425–436 and The Private Eyes' Requiem)
, known as Mitch Tsuburaya in English and dubbed by Funimation as Mitch Tennison, is a friend of Ayumi Yoshida and Genta Kojima who enjoys reading science books and takes a scientific approach to problem-solving. He is infatuated with Ayumi, and later Ai Haibara. He is a smart and well-read first-grader who believes that technology can solve most problems. It was shown that his parents are both teachers. He has an older sister named Asami Tsuburaya, who is two years his senior.

Genta Kojima

Voiced by (English): Dameon Clarke (seasons 1–4), Mike McFarland (season 5) (Funimation); Andrew J. Russel (Bang Zoom); Jorge Barranco (Macias Group)
Voiced by (Japanese): Wataru Takagi
, known as George Kojima in English and dubbed George Kaminski in the Funimation anime and sometimes the Viz manga, is the overweight, self-proclaimed leader of the Junior Detective League. He loves food and can eat more than all the other Junior Detective League members combined. Even though he can be intimidating, he is very kind. He is a friend of Ayumi Yoshida and Mitsuhiko Tsuburaya and has admired his father, who owns a liquor store. Both he and Mitsuhiko have a crush on Ayumi, and they both envy Conan since she likes him.

Ai Haibara 

Voiced by (English): Brina Palencia (Funimation); Erica Mendez (Bang Zoom); Xanthe Huynh (Macias Group)
Voiced by (Japanese): Megumi Hayashibara
Portrayed by: Yuu Kashii (Shiho); Shibota Kyoka (Ai)
, known as Anita Hailey in English, is a former member of the Black Organization under the code name . A gifted chemist at a young age, she is the inventor of APTX 4869, the poison that shrank Shinichi Kudo. Her parents and sister, Akemi Miyano, also worked for the organization. Shiho betrays the organization after Gin kills her sister.  She took the drug in a suicide attempt, but rather than dying, she, like Shinichi, became small. When she was 18, she escaped the organization and went into hiding. She is taken in by Dr. Agasa and is given the alias Ai Haibara (: known as Anita Hailey in the English version, and dubbed Vi Graythorn by Funimation.  Her alias is derived from the detective characters Cordelia Gray and V.I. Warshawski; "Hai" can mean "gray" in Japanese, and "Ai" is pronounced the same as the English letter "I"; however, in one of the interviews, Gosho Aoyama confirmed her name was a reference to Irene Adler from Sherlock Holmes. She shows affection towards Shinichi, but she denies having such feelings. Despite being constantly in the company of the Junior Detective League and Ran Mori, she was very reserved and only opened up a little more to Ran and Ayumi after some time; she later lets Ayumi call her "Ai-chan" instead of the more formal honorific "Ai-san". She often helps Conan solve cases and find information on the Black Organization to help bring them down in addition to working on the cure to their condition. She has strawberry blonde hair. She grew up in the United States, is half-Japanese and half-English.

Major supporting characters

Dr. Hiroshi Agasa

Voiced by (English): Bill Flynn (Funimation); Michael Sorich (Bang Zoom); Oscar Cheda (Macias Group)
Voiced by (Japanese): Kenichi Ogata
Portrayed by: Ryosei Tayama
, known in English as Herschel Agasa, appears as an absent-minded professor and neighbor to Shinichi Kudo. He is one of the few characters in the story who knows of Kudo's predicament and helps hide his identity as Conan Edogawa, inventing devices such as the voice-impersonating bowtie, tracking glasses, and badges, enhanced shoes and hoverboards, and an instant soccer ball so Conan can fend for himself. He often watches over the Junior Detective League and takes them on trips in his old VW Beetle. After finding Shiho Miyano on the streets, he takes her into his care and gives her the alias Ai Haibara to hide her from the Black Organization. In the Funimation English dub, his name is spelled Hershel Agasa.

Juzo Megure 
 
Voiced by (English): Mark Stoddard (Funimation); Jake Eberle (Bang Zoom); Oscar Cheda (Macias Group)
Voiced by (Japanese): Chafurin
Portrayed by: Masahiko Nishimura; Masatō Ibu
Inspector Juzo Megure (目暮 十三警部, Megure Jūzō-keibu), known in English as Inspector Joseph Maguire, is a veteran police officer in charge of most of Tokyo Metropolitan Police Department's Division 1 of the Criminal Investigation Section. He has worked with Shinichi Kudo, Shinichi's father Yusaku, and was even the boss of Kogoro Mori before the latter becoming a private detective.[ch. 1] He always wears a hat, which hides an old scar that he got from a particular case twenty years ago that involved a woman named Midori, who later became his wife.[ch. 286] He is named after the fictional detective cop Jules Maigret.

Sonoko Suzuki 

Voiced by (English): Laura Bailey (Funimation); Minx Lee (Bang Zoom); Crystal Lopez (Macias Group)
Voiced by (Japanese): Naoko Matsui
Portrayed by: Mayuko Iwasa; Sayaka Akimoto
, known in English as Serena Sebastian, is Ran Mori's best friend. She has light brown hair and comes from a wealthy family with a high social status, although she does not flaunt this, preferring to be an outgoing social girl who chases after and flirts with attractive boys. She is a huge fan of the Kaito Kid. When Kogoro is unavailable, she is usually the person Conan knocks out and impersonates to solve cases instead, to which she sometimes thinks she too is a brilliant detective. In later chapters, she has a long-distance relationship with Makoto Kyogoku, a karate champion at Haido High School.

Heiji Hattori 

Voiced by (English): Kevin M. Connolly (Funimation); Lucien Dodge (Bang Zoom); Jason Kesser (Macias Group)
Voiced by (Japanese): Ryo Horikawa
Portrayed by: Tori Matsuzaka
, known in English as Harley Hartwell, is a high school detective from Osaka and Shinichi Kudo's rival. His intelligence is at par with that of Shinichi, which often leads to intense rivalry between them. He later becomes friends with Conan Edogawa after discovering his true identity as Shinichi. Although he tries to hide it, he often gets concerned for Shinichi's safety when dealing with the Black Organization and warns him to be careful. He has a relationship with Kazuha Toyama, his childhood friend and love interest. Heiji speaks in a Kansai dialect and is also a master kendo fighter. His father Heizo Hattori is the commissioner of the Osaka police department. Heiji was inspired by the fictional Inspector Hattori, from Shunsaku Kudo stories.

Kazuha Toyama 

Voiced by (English): Gwendolyn Lau (Funimation); Kayli Mills (Bang Zoom); Andrea Villaverde (Macias Group)
Voiced by (Japanese): Yūko Miyamura
Portrayed by: Rei Okamoto
, Kirsten Thomas as dubbed by Funimation, is Heiji Hattori's childhood friend and a daughter of a commissioner who is positioned high in the Osaka police department. Heiji and Kazuha's fathers are close friends. Her relationship with Heiji closely mirrors Ran Mori's with Shinichi Kudo; she is too shy to admit that they feel more than friendship for their respective partner. She and Heiji share a pouch with a broken handcuff link; their good luck charm. She was, at first, jealous of Ran because she mistakenly assumed that Ran was in love with Heiji and had a lot of coincidental similarities with him. Upon finding out about Ran's and Shinichi's relationship and Ran's kind personality, she later becomes close friends with Ran. She is also a skilled 2nd-degree blackbelt in Aikido.

Black Organization

The Organization has been known for its involvement in several felonies which range from blackmail to assassinations. Conan's main objective is to bring them down, knowing that he can not return to his life as Jimmy unless doing so, for the sake of protecting his family and friends. The organization members are given code names based on alcoholic beverages. The Black Organization leader's identity had been a mystery for most of the series as he only communicates with his subordinates by text messages until he is revealed as Renya Karasuma, who already had a brief cameo appearance in volume 30 of the manga.

Gin

Voiced by (English): Troy Baker (Funimation); D.C. Douglas (Bang Zoom) 
Voiced by (Japanese): Yukitoshi Hori
Portrayed by: Sasaki Kuranosuke
 is a high-ranking agent in the organization, a merciless killer who fed the APTX 4869 poison to Shinichi Kudo. He drives a black Porsche 356A. He is a high-ranking "executive agent", often giving the other members their orders and supervising group missions. Despite his aggressive demeanor, he has repeatedly shown to be a highly cunning and deductive man, seeing through any deception perpetrated against him. He is also known as Melkior in a few chapters of the Viz Media English-translated manga.

Vodka

Voiced by (English): Kyle Hebert, Christopher Sabat (Funimation); Edward Bosco (Bang Zoom)
Voiced by (Japanese): Fumihiko Tachiki
Portrayed by: Taro Okada
 is a member of the Black Organization and is Gin's partner. He is usually seen alongside Gin. Unlike Gin, Vodka is slow-witted and easy to trick. His official position is that of secretary in the general oversight division, so he handles most of the research and information for the duo, such as setting up meetings, and relaying information to other members. He is also known as Kaspar in a few chapters of the Viz Media English-translated manga.

Vermouth 

Voiced by (English): Laura Post
Voiced by (Japanese): Mami Koyama
, dubbed  by the FBI, is a mysterious member of the Black Organization. Her appearance remains the same even after many years, suggesting she has found a way to sustain her youth. She mastered the skill of disguise alongside her friend Yukiko Kudo. When Sharon died, her daughter  attended the funeral. Still, Conan later discovers Sharon had changed her identity to Chris. She is cold-blooded and unflinching, carrying out the Black Organization's orders in the forms of murders and so forth without remorse. She knows Conan Edogawa's true identity as Shinichi Kudo and Ai Haibara's as Sherry but keeps them a secret from the Black Organization because Shinichi and Ran saved her life back in New York. However, lately, it has been revealed that her protecting Kudo and Mori is not merely because of their salvation but also because of a much greater reason. Sharon wanted to bring down the Black Organization, yet she could not find a good measure. After finding Kudo, she hoped that Kudo would be "the silver bullet" that could destroy the Order. Also, Sharon took Mori as her "most valuable treasure" and was willing to save her and her family from the Order. She was also mysteriously cherished by Anokata. She was also a deep and high-witted woman, finding that Mizunashi is not truly loyal to the Order. Vermouth was inspired by Fujiko Mine from Lupin III and represents her darker and more complicated side. In contrast, Yukiko Kudo represents the more comforting and innocent one.

Kir 

Voiced by (English): Jennifer Losi
Voiced by (Japanese): Kotono Mitsuishi 
 is originally introduced as a news anchor for local television who had moved from morning television to evening news. Conan discovers that she has been going under the alias  in the Black Organization. In the story where the Black Organization tries to assassinate an upcoming politician, she is tasked to interview the politician at the park where the others can shoot him from afar, but Conan thwarts the attempt. She and Vermouth then try to stage an accident so that the politician will step out of his car and get shot. Still, she ends up getting in an accident instead of Vermouth. She is secretly hospitalized under the watch of the FBI. The FBI determines that the Rena Mizunashi name is an alias as it is a pun on 007. She is later revealed to be a double agent working within the Black Organization and reporting to the CIA. The FBI manages to place Hidemi back into the Black Organization so she can continue to spy on them. But to prove her loyalty to the Black Organization, Hidemi is ordered to kill Shuichi Akai. Though under heavy surveillance, she reports information to Jodie Starling.

Chianti and Korn

Voiced by (English): Tamara Ryan (Chianti); Kaiji Tang (Korn)
Voiced by (Japanese): Kikuko Inoue (Chianti); Hiroyuki Kinoshita (Korn) 
Chianti is a goth-styled member with a blood thirsty personality. She is a wild, ruthless assassin who enjoys killing. Her left eyelid bears the tattoo of a swallowtail butterfly's wing. It is implied that she had some sort of relationship with the deceased Organization member Calvados, whose death she blames Vermouth for. Meanwhile, Korn is an elderly man with an emotionless face who enjoys sniping his victims. He is always seen frowning and looks robotic.

Rum

Voiced by (English): Chris Cason (Bang Zoom); Alex Teixeira (Macias Group)
Voiced by (Japanese): Shigeru Chiba
 is the second in charge of the Black Organization; he is very close to the Boss. His physical description varies between an older adult, a feminine man, and a strongly-built man. Still, all sources agree that he has an artificial eye. Conan currently suspects an individual named Asaka, who was the bodyguard of Amanda Hughes, a big fan of Kohji Haneda, because the encoded dying message left by Kohji using a broken mirror seems to point to Asaka being Rum. While it is unclear whether Asaka is Rum or merely related, the Black Organization itself has confirmed the decoding "ASACA RUM" to be correct by being paranoid about things named "Asaca" with a C connected to a 17-year ago timeframe. He inherited the codename from his late father, who had served Renya Karasuma for many years. 

In 2018, Gosho Aoyama confirmed that Rum is one of three main suspects: Hyoue Kuroda, Rumi Wakasa, and Kanenori Wakita. Rum was revealed to be Kanenori Wakita in 2020. Under the alias , he is a sushi chef at Beika Iroha Sushi with an injury to his left eye. His name is an anagram of "Toki wa kane nari", the Romanization of "時は金なり" ("time is money" in Japanese).

That Person 

He directs the Black Organization's activities and plans crimes to protect the Organization and advance its interests. He communicates to subordinates by text messages. His contact email address follows the tune of the children's song ; the number is #969#6261. He is responsible for promoting agents and deciding on their code names; however, the boss has no own code name himself. Instead, he's referred to as "That Person" or "Boss ."His name has been a long-kept secret, but on December 14, 2017, Aoyama revealed his identity to be . Renya Karasuma was first mentioned in volume 30 of the manga and made a brief cameo appearance but only a silhouette of him was shown, he has yet to make his first actual appearance. Not much is known about Renya Karasuma, only that he is 99 years old and is said to have already died 40 years before the start of the story. Still, the circumstances of his death are described as 'quite mysterious,' and no details about his cause of death are known. Yusaku Kudo also told Conan that if Karasuma is still alive, which he appears to be, Conan may designate Japan's richest and most powerful man as his enemy, to which Conan responds that this is exactly what he has been longing to do since he was turned back into a child.

Other Black Organization members
Akemi Miyano

Voiced by (English): Clarine Harp (episode 14),  Alex Valle (Countdown to Heaven) (Funimation); Rebecca Davis (Bang Zoom)
Voiced by (Japanese): Sakiko Tamagawa
 is a low ranking member of the Black Organization under the alias . She is Shiho Miyano's elder sister and also Shuichi Akai's lover. Unlike her sister, she was never considered a high ranking member of the Organization and managed to live a mostly normal life, traveling about freely and going to school. She steals one billion yen to use as a bargaining chip to free her little sister from the Black Organization but is killed by Gin.

Tequila

Voiced by (English): Andrew Chandler
Voiced by (Japanese): Kōsei Hirota
 is a large intimidating member of the Black Organization who muscles people into making deals with his syndicate. He is killed by a briefcase bomb which was meant for another person. Before his death, was negotiating with a famous computer system programmer, Suguru Itakura, and asked him if he could develop some software program that would be useful for the Organization.

Pisco

Voiced by: Yasuo Maramatsu
 is a 71-year-old man named , who was a chairman for an auto manufacturer. He was also close friends with Shiho's parents, although this does not shake his resolve to kill her. Gin kills him on orders from the boss for breaking the Organization's code of secrecy after being photographed as he committed a murder.

Calvados

 is a sniper who covers Vermouth in her confrontation with Jodie while trying to kill Sherry. However, he is disabled by Shuichi Akai and then commits suicide to avoid being taken in by the FBI.

Rikumichi Kusuda

Voiced by: Mitsuo Iwata
 was sent by the Organization to search for Rena Mizunashi in Haido Central Hospital. He pretends to be a patient with a cervical vertebrae sprain to move around the hospital without suspicion. Kusuda flees when his cover is blown but commits suicide when he sees Akai is following him. His corpse is used to fake Akai's death.

Ki'ichiro Numabuchi

Voiced by (English): Barry Yandell
Voiced by (Japanese): Naoki Tatsuta
, known as Cornelius Graver in the English dub, is a former member of the Black Organization. In his first appearance, Ki'ichiro becomes the prime suspect in a serial murder case where his driving school classmates were killed one by one. His innocence is proven, and the real killer is brought to justice after a suicide attempt. According to Anita, Ki'ichiro himself is a serial killer, having murdered three people for the thrill of it before the series started. Because of this, he was recruited to be one of the Black Organization's assassins, but Ki'ichiro's mental instability excused him from these duties. He was planned to be a test subject for the APTX 4869 poison. Still, he escaped and killed three additional people he believed to be Black Organization agents. Despite being a ruthless murderer, he calls fireflies his childhood friends. He has a fondness for children, as seen when he carries a lost Mitch to safety who was attempting to collect fireflies of his own. He surrenders to authorities without resistance and awaiting execution for his past murders.

Law Enforcement

Tokyo Metropolitan Police Department

The Tokyo Metropolitan Police is the law enforcement agency of Tokyo Prefecture. The most commonly recurring characters of the Tokyo MPD are members of Division 1 of the Criminal Investigation Section: Inspector Juzo Megure; his subordinate officers, Miwako Sato, Wataru Takagi, Ninzaburo Shiratori and Kazunobu Chiba; and Megure's new superior, Hyoe Kuroda. Officer Yumi Miyamoto and Naeko Miike of the Traffic Division also appear often.

Miwako Sato

Voiced by (English): Kate Oxley (Funimation); Katelyn Gault (Bang Zoom); Sarah Bartels (Macias Group)
Voiced by (Japanese): Atsuko Yuya
Portrayed by: Natsuhi Ueno
, Michele Simone as dubbed by Funimation, is a smart, highly attractive, energetic, and a dedicated young female officer who works for Inspector Megure. She is hugely popular with the male members of the police department, but is oblivious to the fact that her colleague Wataru Takagi likes her romantically. However, she gradually develops feelings for him as well.

Wataru Takagi 

Voiced by (English): Doug Burks (Funimation); Christopher Bevins (Bang Zoom); Diego Klock-Perez (Macias Group)
Voiced by (Japanese): Wataru Takagi
Portrayed by: Yuichi Tsuchiya
, Harry Wilder, as dubbed by Funimation, is an officer who works for Megure. He has feelings for his fellow officer Miwako Sato, and gets jealous whenever he hears she is interested in someone. He sometimes deflects any praises and motivational compliments she might give. Though he has an appearance of ineffectual nervousness, he is quick to assess a situation and take immediate and decisive action when necessary. He has a knack for getting out of situations out of sheer luck. He is named after his Japanese voice actor, having gotten the name during an episode recording in which the character was asked his name and the voice actor ad-libbed the reply "It's Takagi".

Ninzaburo Shiratori

Voiced by (English): Eric Vale (Funimation); Greg Chun (Bang Zoom); Christopher Diaz (Macias Group) 
Voiced by (Japanese): Kaneto Shiozawa (1996–2000); Kazuhiko Inoue (2000–present)
, known as Santos in English and Nicholas Santos in the Funimation dub, is introduced as a recently promoted officer who works with Inspector Megure. He is a member of the 1st Investigation Division. He has unrequited feelings towards Miwako Sato and often tries to interfere in Sato and Takagi's dates In later chapters, he reveals the feelings originated from a young girl in his childhood who had a strong sense of justice and resembled Sato physically. After meeting Conan Edogawa's elementary school teacher, Sumiko Kobayashi, Shiratori realizes she is the girl from his past and develops a relationship with her. He is known to have good knowledge of wine and architecture.

Kazunobu Chiba 

Voiced by (English): Chris Cason (Funimation); Jason Charles Miller (Bang Zoom); Alexander Blanco (Macias Group)
Voiced by (Japanese): Isshin Chiba
 is Takagi's partner and colleague. He is a light-hearted officer and a fan of tokusatsu shows who mostly makes cameo appearances as an officer in the background. He had a crush on a girl named Naeko Miike when he was young and shared mutual affection. Unbeknownst to him, Naeko Miike recently transferred to the Tokyo Metropolitan Police Department.

Yumi Miyamoto

Voiced by (English): Amanda Lee (Bang Zoom); Crystal Lopez (Macias Group)
Voiced by (Japanese): Yu Sugimoto
 is a female police officer in the traffic department. She is friends with Miwako Sato and tries to push both Sato and colleague Wataru Takagi towards each other in a relationship. After learning that her subordinate Naeko Miine likes Chiba, she gets a bit jealous that she is the sole person among her police friends who isn't in a relationship.

Naeko Miike

Voiced by (English): Ann Marie Olson
Voiced by (Japanese): Rie Tanaka
 is a young female police officer who works in the Tokyo MPD traffic department directly under Yumi Miyamoto. She is Chiba's childhood friend and love interest.

Inspector Yuminaga

Voiced by: Natsuo Tokuhiro
 is from the Arson Investigation Section 1 of the First Division, who therefore deals with arson cases. Kogoro Mori, who was his subordinate, nicknamed him "fiery old fossil".

Kiyonaga Matsumoto 
 
Voiced by (English): Bob Carter
Voiced by (Japanese): Seizō Katō
, dubbed by Funimation as Kristopher McLaughlin, is the superior officer of Inspector Megure and his subordinates. His brutish appearance and the scar running down his left eye easily hide the fact that he is a caring, if somewhat stern, father figure. He is widowed and has a single daughter, named Sayuri. He received the scar on his face during a confrontation with a serial killer fifteen years prior to the series. Recently, he has been promoted and his position taken over by Hyoe Kuroda.

Hyoe Kuroda

Voiced by (English): Richard Epcar (Bang Zoom); Rio Chavarro (Macias Group)
Voiced by (Japanese): Yukimasa Kishino
 is the former Nagano Police First Division Chief. He is currently the Tokyo Police First Division Managing Officer after replacing Kiyonaga Matsumoto, who has been promoted. He had been in a coma for ten years due to an accident and had pitch-black hair before that. His right eye was injured during that accident, and it is replaced with an artificial one. He was one of the three suspects of Rum.

Osaka Prefecture Police

Heizo Hattori 

Voiced by (English): Andrew T. Chandler (Funimation); Rick Zieff (Bang Zoom); Jason Kesser (Macias Group)
Voiced by (Japanese): Takehiro Koyama
Heizo Hartwell (known as Heizo Hartwell in English and as Martin Hartwell in the Funimation dub, is Heiji's father and the Commissioner of the Osaka Prefectural Police; he is Superintendent Supervisor (Rank 2). Shizuka Hattori is his wife. At times, he is supportive of his son's desire to be a detective. Heizo has occasionally assisted his son in cracking a difficult case. Though he has a tough exterior, he is a devoted father, family member, and friend. In the Osaka district, he is close with Goro Otaki and Ginshiro Toyama. Heiji initially met Toyama's daughter, Kazuha, as a result of Heizo's friendship with Ginshiro Toyama. Heizo was named after the fictional Heizo Hasegawa and the real-life Hattori Hanzō.

Ginshiro Toyama

Voiced by (English): Doug Burks (Funimation); Kyle Hebert (Bang Zoom); Alex Teixeira (Macias Group)
Voiced by (Japanese): Masato Sako; Shinji Ogawa
, known as Chief Thomas in the Funimation dub, is the Chief Criminal Investigator (or Chief Detective) in the Osaka police district, and Kazuha's father. He is close friends with Heiji's father.

Goro Otaki 

Voiced by (English): Bill Jenkins (Funimation);  Paul St. Peter (Bang Zoom); Paul Louis (Macias Group)
Voiced by (Japanese): Norio Wakamoto
, known in the Funimation dub as Inspector Odin, is the chief inspector of the Osaka district and is good friends with Heizo Hattori and Ginshiro Toyama. Otaki is also close friends with Heizo's son, Heiji, who often calls Otaki to find information for an important case. Sometimes, Otaki even assists Heiji and has lent a big helping hand a few times in helping Heiji and Conan solve cases.

Nagano Prefecture Police

Kansuke Yamato

Voiced by (English): Christopher Diaz
Voiced by (Japanese): Yuji Takada
 is an officer with the Nagano Prefectural Police who first appears in a case of murders where centipedes are placed by the victims' heads. He is a serious officer who is overly assertive when interrogating suspects. He has a pair of crisscrossed scars over his blinded left eye and a permanently injured left leg due to an avalanche accident that occurred while chasing a criminal. His name is similar to that of the general and military strategist Yamamoto Kansuke.

Yui Uehara

Voiced by (English): Ghia Burns
Voiced by (Japanese): Ami Koshimizu
 is an officer with the Nagano Prefectural Police and a childhood friend of Kansuke Yamato, whom she is secretly in love with. Professional and considerate to others, she is the opposite of Kansuke. When Kansuke was presumed dead, Yui resigned from the force and took it upon herself to marry into the  family to investigate the death of another well-loved colleague. After the centipede murders case, she rejoins the police force.

Takaaki Morofushi

Voiced by (English): Rayner Gabriel
Voiced by (Japanese): Sho Hayami
, nicknamed  after the chancellor from the Romance of the Three Kingdoms, is an inspector with the police force in the Arano Precinct of Nagano Prefecture. Since elementary school, he and Yamato have been rivals, and he is the older brother of Hiromitsu Morofushi. Morofushi's exploits as a child served as the basis for the novel Little Kong Ming of Class 2-A, with another character in it based on Kansuke. Morofushi cherishes the book, keeping it in the glove compartment of his car, as the author was a childhood friend of his who died. Morofushi graduated with honors from a top university. Still, when he joined the Nagano Prefectural Police, he never bothered to apply to become a ranked officer. When Kansuke went missing in the case that caused his injuries, Morofushi ignored his orders, tracked down the suspect, and helped save Kansuke. But as punishment, he was demoted to an inspector of the local precinct. He often quotes phrases from Romance of the Three Kingdoms, is rather impulsive, and prefers to work alone.

Other prefecture police

Misao Yamamura

Voiced by (English): Kent Williams
Voiced by (Japanese): Toshio Furukawa
, Detective Magnum as dubbed by Funimation, is a young police officer from the Gunma Prefecture. He is naive, clumsy, not very bright and often tries to record the deductions of the sleeping Kogoro Mori on film but usually fails to do so. Since Conan has tranquilized him to reveal murderers so often, Yamamura was promoted to police inspector.

Sango Yokomizo

Voiced by (English): Dameon Clarke
Voiced by (Japanese): Akio Otsuka
, Inspector Worthington as dubbed by Funimation, is a police officer originally seen with the Saitama police, before being transferred to Shizuoka. He is quite a capable officer. He comes as intimidating due to speaking loudly and getting close to a suspect's face.

Jugo Yokomizo

Voiced by: Akio Otsuka
 is an inspector for the Kanagawa police and the twin brother of Sango Yokomizo. Both started their police career in Saitama, but sometime later, Sango transferred to the Shizuoka district. However, they do stay in touch and have even assisted each other in various (and even locally unrelated) cases.

FBI

The fictional Federal Bureau of Investigation in the series consists of many agents led by James Black. They are investigating Sharon Vineyard and have followed her to Japan where they discovered the existence of the Black Organization.

Jodie Starling

Voiced by (English): Maureen Price
Voiced by (Japanese): Miyuki Ichijou
She enjoys video games and is easy-going outside the classroom. She is later revealed to be an FBI agent with a personal vendetta against Vermouth who murdered her father. She knows of Conan Edogawa's detective skills and often has him help the FBI to battle the Black Organization. She had been Shuichi Akai's girlfriend before he met Akemi Miyano.

James Black

Voiced by (English): Jamieson Price 
Voiced by (Japanese): Iemasa Kayumi (2001–2015); Takaya Hashi (2015–present)
 is the head of operations on the hunt for the Black Organization in Japan. He first appears in volume 32 as an old guy with glasses and a moustache. Since his revelation in connection with the FBI, he and his colleagues have worked closely with Conan whenever their common cause would bring them together.

Shuichi Akai

Voiced by (English): Keith Silverstein (Bang Zoom); Clay Cartland (Macias Group)
Voiced by (Japanese): Shūichi Ikeda
 was first introduced as a mysterious man who wears a knit cap spying on Conan Edogawa. He is later revealed to be an FBI agent, and Jodie Starling's partner. In the past, he was a spy within the Black Organization. He was given the codename  until his identity as an FBI agent was accidentally revealed by André Camel. Shuichi holds a personal vendetta against the organization for murdering his love interest Akemi Miyano. Due to his cunning mind and impressive skills, the Black Organization considered him their greatest threat. He is then shot by Kir in the chest and the head, with his body left in a truck that explodes.
He stays at Shinichi Kudo's house with Conan's permission after his apartment has burned down. He states he is a graduate student concentrating on engineering and is revealed to have high deduction skills, being a fan of Sherlock Holmes. It is revealed later that he is Shuichi Akai in disguise after his fake death and has come to realize that Conan Edogawa is Shinichi Kudo.
Gosho chose the character's surname name from Char Aznable, a fictional character from the Mobile Suit Gundam series, who is nicknamed . As for the personal name, Gosho took the given name of Char's voice actor, Shūichi Ikeda. When Shuichi was set to appear in the anime, Gosho requested Shūichi Ikeda to be the voice actor.

André Camel

Voiced by (English): Chris Tergliafera 
Voiced by (Japanese): Kiyoyuki Yanada (2008–2022); Kenji Nomura (2022–present)
 is a brutish-looking FBI agent introduced in the storyline when the FBI was planning to move Rena Mizunashi out of the hospital. In the past, he accidentally exposed Shuichi Akai's identity as an FBI agent to the Black Organization and impeded his mission as a spy. He felt his mistake caused Akai's love interest to be killed by the Black Organization and has thus felt indebted to Akai ever since. Camel is named after Lieutenant Dren from Mobile Suit Gundam, who is the second-in-command of Camel Squadron under Char Aznable.

Public Security Bureau
In the series, the National Police Agency Security Bureau (usually along with Tokyo Metropolitan Police Department Public Security Bureau collectively called the Public Security Police (公安警察 Kōan-keisatsu)) sent Rei Furuya and Scotch to infiltrate the Black Organization. Rei found Shuichi standing over Scotch's dead body holding a smoking gun a few years ago. He believes that Scotch was killed by him, who was also infiltrating the Black Organization on behalf of the FBI at the same time. As a result, Rei Furuya hated Shuichi and the FBI generally and hoped they would leave Japan altogether.

Rei Furuya

Voiced by (English): Kyle McCarley (Bang Zoom); Jason Kesser (Macias Group)
Voiced by (Japanese): Tōru Furuya
Rei feigns interest in being Richard's apprentice in order to gather information on Shiho Miyano. After Shiho fakes her death, he begins to suspect Conan of being the one behind Richard's deductions. Due to a past incident, he despises Shuichi Akai and later discovers that he is still alive. He planned to turn Shuichi over to the Black Organization to gain the Organization's trust and get closer to the heart of the Organization. However, Conan managed to outsmart his plan with the help of Shuichi. He is often seen working with Vermouth, but it is unclear how much they trust or know about each other. It is revealed that he knows Vermouth's relationship with the boss.

Hiromitsu Morofushi

Voiced by (English): Chris Flores
Voiced by (Japanese): Hikaru Midorikawa 
 was an undercover member of the Tokyo Metropolitan Police Department Public Security Bureau inside the Black Organization with the codename . He is the younger brother of Takaaki Morofushi. Not much has been revealed about his past and his time inside the organization. Nonetheless, he was acquainted with Rei Furuya, an undercover agent from the same organization, and Shuichi Akai, an undercover FBI agent using the alias Dai Moroboshi. Vermouth mentions that Scotch was killed before his real name was revealed to the other Black Organization members. It is revealed that Scotch's death was a suicide.

Other recurring characters

Yoko Okino

Voiced by (English): Elise Baughman (Funimation); Emi Lo (Bang Zoom) 
Voiced by (Japanese): Yuri Amano (1996–1998); Miki Nagasawa (1998–present) 
Portrayed by: Becky
 is a young pop star idol who is a regular focus of worship by Richard Moore. She has a number of appearances throughout the series, mostly as a prominent guest at some social gatherings which turn into criminal cases. In one of the cases, she is revealed to be a former member of a girl group called Earth Ladies.

Yusaku Kudo 

Voiced by (English): Randy Tallman, John Swasey (The Phantom of Baker Street) (Funimation); Keith Silverstein (Bang Zoom)
Voiced by (Japanese): Hideyuki Tanaka
, known in English as Booker Kudo, is Shinichi Kudo's father. He is a famous author of detective stories and created the popular  character. He is extremely intelligent, with deduction skills even superior to Shinichi's, and often helped the police solve cases in the past. He was the one who created the name Kaito Kid from the Phantom Thief 1412 moniker. It was even hinted that he may have known Toichi Kuroba was the Kaito Kid he was facing.

Yukiko Kudo 

Voiced by (English): Laurie Steele (Funimation); Erika Harlacher (Bang Zoom)
Voiced by (Japanese): Sumi Shimamoto
, known in English as Vivian Kudo, is Shinichi Kudo's mother and wife of Yusaku Kudo. She was a former actress who was trained in the art of disguise by Toichi Kuroba but gave up her career at age twenty to marry Yusaku. She occasionally shows up in Japan to see her son. Because of her reputation as the wife of a famous mystery author and for involving herself in some criminal cases which she occasionally helps to solve, she has been given the nickname "The Night Baroness" after the main character that her husband created for his mystery novels. Vivian was inspired by Fujiko Mine from Lupin III and represents her good side, while Vermouth represents the bad. The Yukiko Fujimine name combines Fujiko Mine and the first name of Fujiko's former voice actress, Yukiko Nikaido.

Eri Kisaki

Voiced by (English): Julie Mayfield (Funimation); Jane Alan (Bang Zoom)
Voiced by (Japanese): Gara Takashima
, known in English as Eva Kisaki, and dubbed by Funimation as Eva Kadan, is Ran Mori's lawyer mother who has been separated from Kogoro for the last ten years. She is known as the Queen of the legal world. She still wears her wedding ring and still cares for him, but is not above testing his love for her. She is also highly skilled in Judo, having been taught by Kogoro, but bad at cooking skills and has a Russian Blue kitten named Goro (Ricky in English) that was based on Kogoro's name. 20 years ago, she and Yukiko Kudo were classmates at Teitan High; they were so popular that the school had to cancel their beauty pageant. Her name, Eri Kisaki, originates from Ellery Queen;  means "Queen."

Kaito Kid

Voiced by (English): Jerry Jewell (Funimation); Griffin Burns (Bang Zoom/Macias Group)
Voiced by (Japanese): Kappei Yamaguchi
Originally the protagonist of Gosho Aoyoma's Magic Kaito series,  is a gentleman thief who employs the use of magic tricks to steal gems in his heists. He is a master of disguise and often escapes from the police through the use of his hang glider. He appears in Case Closed to perform daring thefts while a large audience watches. His striking resemblance to Shinichi Kudo allows him to impersonate Shinichi without the use of a mask.

Makoto Kyogoku

Voiced by (English): Christian LaMonte (Bang Zoom); Alex Machado (Macias Group)
Voiced by (Japanese): Nobuyuki Hiyama
 is Sonoko Suzuki's long distance boyfriend. He attended Haido High School, where he was a prominent member, and eventually the captain, of his karate team and became known as "The Prince of Kicks". He noticed Sonoko cheering on her friend Ran during a martial arts tournament, and became interested in her. As a master martial artist, Makoto is usually cool and collected, especially in crisis situations, and also a keen observer. The only thing which throws him off is his affection for Sonoko, for whom he will go great lengths, even forsake an important tournament just to meet her. However, Makoto's bashfulness around her, his dedication to his fighting skills and some competitive impulse keep him jumping from one obligation to the other, so their relationship is a bit difficult.

Sumiko Kobayashi 

Voiced by (English): Stephanie Young
Voiced by (Japanese): Yuko Kato
, Liz Faulkner as dubbed by Funimation, is the Junior Detective League's class teacher. Actually a kind person, in her initial period at Teitan Elementary she was harsh and strict to her students, which was in fact prompted by a previous bad experience and her innate stage fright. With the help of Conan and the junior detectives she has warmed considerably, and after having seen the Junior Detective League in action she has even appointed herself as their advisor. When she wears contacts, she resembles officer Sato. It is later revealed that she had a past childhood encounter with Inspector Shiratori and develops a relationship with him.

Tomoaki Araide

Voiced by: Hideyuki Hori 
 is a young doctor and the son of Kogoro Mori's physician. He was once the basketball coach at Ran's school and, upon their first encounter, thought to be a rival to Shinichi for Rachel's affection. He has reappeared in Conan's vicinity on several occasions - seemingly at least; his identity was used by Vermouth in order to track down Shiho Miyano. He was almost murdered by her to facilitate the cover, but the FBI had temporarily moved him to safety in America.

Jirokichi Suzuki 

Voiced by (English): John Snyder (Bang Zoom); Alex Teixeira (Macias Group)
Voiced by (Japanese): Ichirō Nagai (2004–2014); Kōsei Tomita (2014–present)
, known in English as Jirokichi Sebastian, is a glory hounding seventy-two-year-old man and Sonoko Suzuki's uncle. Despite his age, he is very fit and is an active industrial advisor for the Suzuki company. Ever since Kaito Kid stole his place on the paper's front page, he had been obsessed with catching Kid to raise his fame. He loves to ride his customized accelerated motorcycle with his dog Lupin. His great wealth allows him to buy top-notch security and several ways of lockdown to surround Kid, but so far, none of his plans have worked. Even when Kaito Kid's theft is foiled, Conan usually ends up taking up the news spotlight. His Japanese voice actor was After Ichirō Nagai's death, his Japanese voice actor is.

Eisuke Hondo

Voiced by: Junko Noda
 is Ran Mori's very clumsy new classmate, eager to see the Sleeping Detective in action. Conan suspects his actions may be an act as he was able to enter Kogoro's office undetected, and his behavior in checking with a child on whether he told the truth resembles that of Rena Mizunashi. It is later revealed that Eisuke believed that Rena murdered his sister and father when in actuality, Rena was his sister under an alias. Eisuke had leukemia when he was younger, and when Rena was his donor in a bone marrow transplant, his blood type changed from O to AB. Eisuke, after learning of his father and sister's career as CIA agents, turns down witness protection from the FBI, but then plans to go to America to pursue a career as a CIA agent. He tells Conan that he is going to confess his love to Ran because of her kindness, but gives up when he sees Conan's reaction, and then reveals that he has known all along that Conan is Shinichi, having observed Kogoro's deductive style changing since Shinichi's disappearance and Conan's appearance.

Masumi Sera

Voiced by (English): Ghia Burns
Voiced by (Japanese): Noriko Hidaka
 is a female teenage detective who has taken an interest in Conan's affairs; she enrolls at Shinichi and Ran's high school. She has two older brothers, Shuichi Akai and Shukichi Haneda. She is skilled at jeet kune do, a hobby encouraged by her brother Shuichi who mailed her instruction videos while in elementary school. It is revealed that she knows Conan is Shinichi Kudo, and she had met him and Ran 10 years ago at a beach somewhere in Japan. She lived in Britain for three years.

Shukichi Haneda

Voiced by: Toshiyuki Morikawa 
 is a professional shogi player, as well as the former boyfriend of Yumi Miyamoto. Yumi nicknames him  because he keeps eating cheese like a mouse which makes a noise that sounds a lot like 'Chu'. He is also the middle brother of the Akai family, making him the sibling of Shuichi Akai and Masumi Sera.

Mary Sera

Voiced by (English): Kira Buckland
Voiced by (Japanese): Atsuko Tanaka
 is a middle-schooler with light hair who has been hiding in various hotels in Tokyo with Masumi Sera. Despite her appearance, she is a middle-aged woman and the mother of Shuichi Akai, Shukichi Haneda and Masumi Sera. She is an MI6 agent. During the timeline of Holmes' Revelation, Vermouth fed Mary something like APTX 4869, which caused her body to shrink from that of a middle-aged woman to that of a middle-school child, on the Vauxhall Bridge. Vermouth also implied that Elena Miyano is the younger sister of Mary after feeding Mary the drug. Her eyes have a remarkable resemblance to those of Shuichi Akai and Masumi Sera.

Momiji Ooka 

Voiced by (English): Faye Mata
Voiced by (Japanese): Satsuki Yukino
 is a second-year student from Kyoto Senshin High School and a champion of Hyakunin Isshu karuta. She lives in the Higashiyama district of Kyoto. Her family is likely wealthy since she has a personal butler, third to Renya Karasuma and Suzuki plutocrats. Momiji claims Heiji "proposed her when they were little" and thus believes that they will be romantically involved in the future.

Rumi Wakasa

Voiced by: Fumi Hirano
 is the new Deputy Homeroom Teacher at Teitan Elementary school for Year 1 Class B. Her personality seems to be that of a clumsy and incapable teacher. She approached the Detective Boys because she was scared of the old warehouse at the school and needed them to come with her. However, once she was out of sight of the Detective Boys, her personality changed dramatically to that of a skilled fighter with a scary face. Her right eye suffers from amaurosis fugax. Most likely, her name is meant to resemble "ASAKA RUM", the code from Kohji Haneda's death, with the addition of a W and an I. She was one of the three suspects of Rum.

Azusa Enomoto

Voiced by (English): Janice Kawaye (Bang Zoom); Ghia Burns (Macias Group)
Voiced by (Japanese): Mikiko Enomoto
 is a kind and young worker at the Café Poirot, the coffee shop that is directly under Mori's Detective Agency. Kogoro often goes there for a quick coffee break. Azusa sometimes gives Kogoro a case to solve, mostly involving missing cell phones and cell phone messages.

Tsutomu Akai

Voiced by: Koichi Yamadera
 is the father of Shuichi Akai, Shukichi Haneda, Masumi Sera and husband of Mary Sera. He is an MI6 agent. 17 years ago, someone got him involved in the murder case of Kohji Haneda and Amanda Hughes and he disappeared.

Sakurako Yonehara 

Voiced by: Sakura Tange
 is a housekeeper. She is Naeko Miike and Kazunobu Chiba's childhood friend. She has noticed Conan has a split personality.

Kohji Haneda

Voiced by: Hiroki Yasumoto
 was a talented shogi player and Shukichi Haneda's non-blood brother, either by adoption, marriage, or some other means. Many had high hopes that Kohji would win all seven of the major shogi titles. He died under mysterious circumstances 17 years ago when he was in the United States participating in a chess tournament, a game he also enjoyed. He left a dying message on a broken mirror on the floor, with remaining letters as "P-T-O-N" cut from "PUT ON MASCARA". Conan and Akai interpreted it as "RUM ASACA", but Yusaku Kudo interpreted it as a single name "CARASUMA", pointing to Renya Karasuma. Ai Haibara suggests that Kohji may have been murdered with APTX 4869 since a person with the same name appeared on the list of people killed by the poison. Masumi and Mary research his death. Rumi Wakasa has memories of Kohji Haneda before his murder. Kohji had a shogi bishop as his amulet. The shogi piece was later possessed by Rumi Wakasa after Kohji's murder.

Reception
The name changes done by Funimation Entertainment and Viz Media were highly criticized. Carlo Santos of Anime News Network criticized how they attempted to Americanize the main characters' names yet the secondary characters were able to keep their Japanese names. Eduardo M. Chavez of Mania.com and Jeffrey Harris of IGN agreed that the name changes were pointless.

Due to the popularity of the series, the characters from the series were used in a pamphlet to introduce the 34th G8 summit and were used to promote general crime fighting. The characters were also featured on commemorative stamps. Statues of Shinichi Kudo, Conan Edogawa, and Ran Mori are found at Hokuei, Tottori. Several figurines were produced based on the likeness of the characters in the Case Closed series. Many characters were also featured on trading cards from the Case Closed collectible card game.

Notes

References
General
 

Specific

Primary

 
 
 
 
 
 
 
 
 
 
 
 
 
 
 
 
 
 
 
 
 
 
 
 
 
 
 
 
 
 
 
 
 
 
 
 
 
 
 
 
 
 
 
 
 
 
 
 
 
 
 
 
 
 
 
 
 
 
 
 
 
 
 
 
 
 
 
 
 
 
 
 
 
 
 
 
 
 
 
 
 
 
 
 
 
 
 
 
 
 
 
 
 
 
 
 
 
 
 
 

Case Closed